Livestock is one or more domesticated animals raised in an agricultural setting.

Livestock may also refer to:

 Livestock (Brand X album), 1977
 Livestock (Fraternity album), 1971
 Livestock (film), a 2009 American independent horror film
 Livestock (rapper), a rapper and hip-hop artist from Guelph, Ontario
 Al-An'am, "Livestock", sixth chapter of the Qur'an